Yolanda Ramos (born 4 September 1968) is a Spanish actress and comedian from Catalonia. He has featured in supporting performances in films such as Carmina and Amen and television series such as Paquita Salas and Cardo.

Biography 
Yolanda Ramos was born in Cerdanyola del Vallès, province of Barcelona. She worked in her early career as vedette in Poble Sec.

She has taken part in several shows of the theatre groups El Terrat and La Cubana. In the last years, she has become very popular thanks to her impersonations in Homo Zapping. She featured in a minor role in Pedro Almodóvar's Volver (2006), playing the role of a jerky journalist in a television set.

She is married to Mario Matute and they have one child, Charlotte, born in 2013.

In September 2020, while filming in Mauritius, during COVID-19 pandemic, she tested positive for COVID-19.

TV 
MasterChef Celebrity 4 - Contestant: 5th classified (2019)
Benvinguts a la família (2018)
Villaviciosa de al lado (2016)
Tu cara me suena - Contestant: 9th classified (2016)
El intermedio (2006-2008)
7 Vidas (2006)
Buenafuente (2005)
Homo Zapping (2003–2005)
Los más (2005)
Vitamina N (2002–2004)
Me lo dijo Pérez (1999)

Accolades

References

External links

1968 births
Living people
Actresses from Catalonia
Spanish television actresses
Spanish comedians
Spanish stand-up comedians
Spanish vedettes
21st-century Spanish actresses